Events in the year 1844 in Portugal.

Incumbents 
Monarch: Mary II
Prime Minister: António Bernardo da Costa Cabral, 1st Marquis of Tomar

Events

Births

Full date missing 
 José Simões Dias, poet, short-story writer, literary critic, politician, pedagogue (died 1899).

Deaths 

18 November – Bernardo Peres da Silva, governor of Portuguese India (b. 1775)

References 

 
1840s in Portugal
Years of the 19th century in Portugal
Portugal